David Ritz (born December 2, 1943, in New York City) is an American author. He has written novels, biographies, magazine articles, and over a hundred liner notes for artists such as Aretha Franklin, Ray Charles, and Nat King Cole. He has coauthored 36 autobiographies, including some celebrities' autobiographies.

Career and bibliography

As a journalist
“Happy Song: Soul Music in the Ghetto,” Ritz's first critical essay, was published in Salmagundi (1970). Dozens of other articles have followed, including “History of the Jews of Dallas,” D Magazine (1974); “Kids’ Stuff: Jackson Pollock, Jimmie Vaughan and the Architecture of Las Vegas,” Art Connoisseur (1998); “Show and Tell,” introduction to Rolling Stone's Tattoo Nation (2002); the forward to Lady Sings the Blues, the 50th-anniversary edition of the autobiography of Billie Holiday (2006); and “The Last Days of Brother Ray,” included in Da Capo's Best Music Writing of 2005.

As a biographer
Ritz's first collaboration was Brother Ray (1978), the autobiography of Ray Charles. Ritz has said that his initial intention was to write a biography until becoming intrigued by the idea of rendering the book entirely in Charles' voice. "That's when I discovered I had a gift for channeling voice", Ritz told the L.A. Times' Patrick Goldstein in 2012. "That discovery changed the course of my literary life."

Other autobiographies co-written by Ritz include:
Divided Soul: The Life of Marvin Gaye began when Ritz met Gaye in the late seventies and was published in 1985, a year after the singer's death.
Rhythm And The Blues: A Life in American Music (1993) with Jerry Wexler
Rage To Survive: The Etta James Story (1995) with Etta James
Blues All Around Me: The Autobiography of B. B. King (1996) with B.B. King
The Brothers Neville (2000) with the Neville Brothers
True You: A Journey to Finding and Loving Yourself (2011) with Janet Jackson
When I Left Home: My Story (2012) with Buddy Guy
Soulacoaster (2012) with R. Kelly
On Time: A Princely Life in Funk (2019) with Morris Day

Ritz has also written an inspirational book. Messengers, a portrait of African-American gospel singers and ministers, was published in 2006.

As a novelist
Ritz's fiction ranges from sports fantasies--The Man Who Brought the Dodgers Back To Brooklyn (1981)-- to jazz fantasies--Blue Notes Under a Green Felt Hat (1989) and Barbells and Saxophones (1989).

Ritz collaborated with Mable John on three Christian novels: Sanctified (2006), Stay Out of the Kitchen (2007) and Love Tornado (2008).  He has also collaborated with rapper T.I. on two novels— Power and Beauty (2011) and Trouble and Triumph (2012).

As a lyricist
The platinum-selling song "Sexual Healing" was written in Ostend, Belgium in April 1982 and is credited as a collaboration between Marvin Gaye, Odell Brown, and Ritz.  Ritz was not originally credited as songwriter, and his contribution to the song has been debated, with many sources claiming that he contributed only the title. Ritz sued Marvin Gaye for songwriting credit; Ritz received credit only after settling with Marvin Gaye's estate after the singer's death. Ritz claims that the lawsuit was settled because he had interview tapes with Marvin Gaye in which Gaye says, "These are great lyrics you wrote."

David Ritz also co-wrote three songs including the title track from Guy King's 2016 album Truth.

Personal life
Ritz graduated from the University of Texas in Austin in 1966, and received a Masters of Arts from the State University of New York at Buffalo in 1970, where he studied with literary critic Leslie Fiedler.

He has been married to Roberta Michele Ritz since 1968. They have two children, twins Alison and Jessica, born in 1974.

Awards
 1992 Grammy, Best Album Notes for Aretha Franklin's Queen Of Soul - The Atlantic Recordings
Ritz has also been nominated for four additional Grammys: “Ray Charles 50th Anniversary Collection,” Liner Notes (1997); “Ray Charles 50th Anniversary Collection,” Producer (1997); “Ray Charles—Pure Genius,” Liner Notes (2005); “Aretha Franklin—The Golden Reign,” Liner Notes (2008).

 1993 Ralph J. Gleason Award for Jerry Wexler: Rhythm and the Blues.
 1995 Ralph J. Gleason Award for Etta James: Rage to Survive.
 1996 Ralph J. Gleason Award for BB King’s Blues All Around Me
 2000 Ralph J. Gleason Award for the Neville Brothers' The Brothers Neville
 2006 ASCAP Deems Taylor Award for liner notes of Johnny “Guitar” Watson: The Funk Anthology, released by Shout! Factory
 2011 ASCAP Deems Taylor Award for liner notes of Nat King Cole & Friends: Riffin, released by Verve/Hip-O Select.com/Universal Music Enterprises
 2013 Living Blues Reader's Poll, Best Book for When I Left Home: My Story – Buddy Guy and David Ritz – Da Capo Press
 2013 Association for Recorded Sound Award for Best Historical Research in Blues/Gospel/Hip-hop/R&B for When I Left Home: My Story – Buddy Guy and David Ritz – Da Capo
 2013 ASCAP Timothy White Award for Outstanding Musical Biography for When I Left Home: My Story- Buddy Guy and David Ritz

References

External links
 

American music journalists
Marvin Gaye
Grammy Award winners
1942 births
Living people
Place of birth missing (living people)
American male non-fiction writers
20th-century American biographers
21st-century American biographers